Roy Hollister Williams is a best selling author and marketing consultant best known for his Wizard of Ads trilogy. He is founder of the Wizard Academy institute and lives in Austin, Texas with his wife Pennie.

Williams was born March 29, 1958 in Dallas, Texas. Williams grew up in Broken Arrow, Oklahoma where he met his future wife Pennie while in high school. Williams attended Oklahoma State University before dropping out after day two and is known for saying "I didn't really pay that close attention on the second day."

Williams produces and publishes a free weekly column and podcast titled the Monday Morning Memo.
Williams also hosts a live webcast on the second Monday of each month called "Wizard of Ads LIVE".

Bibliography

 Does your ad dog bite?: (or is it just a show dog?) the warm, witty, and revealing thoughts of America's most controversial ad writer (Miracle Publishing 1997)
 The Wizard of Ads: Turning Words into Magic and Dreamers into Millionaires (Bard Press, 25 July 1998) 
 Secret Formulas of the Wizard of Ads: Turning Paupers into Princes and Lead into Gold (Bard Press, 25 September 1999) 
 Magical Worlds of the Wizard of Ads: Tools and Techniques for Profitable Persuasion (Bard Press, 25 December 2001) 
 Free the Beagle: A Journey to Destinae (Bard Press, 25 October 2002) 
 Sundown in Muskogee (Wizard Academy Press, 29 March 2003) 
 Destinae (Wizard Academy Press, 26 September 2003) 
 Beagles Visit the Seven Sisters
 People Stories; Inside the Outside (Wizard Academy Press, 22 April 2006)

Best Sellers Lists

All three books included in William's Wizard of Ads Trilogy including: The Wizard of Ads, Secret Formulas of the Wizard of Ads, Magical Worlds of the Wizard of Ads, have been featured on the Wall Street Journal and New York Times bestsellers lists.

Wizard Academy

Williams founded Wizard Academy in May 2000 as a non-profit 501c3 educational institution located in Austin, Texas.  The institution's goal was to provide in-depth teaching of the communication arts and the principles and philosophy espoused in Williams Wizard of Ads trilogy. The Academy was the brainchild of his wife, Pennie Williams, as a way to get her husband off the road. "Instead of sending him to them for a few hours, why not let them all come to Austin for a few days?"

Ideas
During a brainstorming session at Wizard Academy, Williams came up with the idea for the PropertyGuys.com unique round real estate sign.

References

External links
 Roy H. Williams Marketing
 Wizard of Ads
 Wizard Academy
 Monday Morning Memo

American business writers
Living people
American marketing people
Writers from Austin, Texas
American bloggers
American podcasters
21st-century American non-fiction writers
Year of birth missing (living people)